The 1959 Little All-America college football team is composed of college football players from small colleges and universities who were selected by the Associated Press (AP) as the best players at each position. For 1959, the AP selected three teams of 11 players each, with no separate defensive platoons.

Quarterback Sam McCord from East Texas State passed for 559 yards and 13 touchdowns, rushed for 887 yards, handled punting, and was also the team's best defensive back with four interceptions.

Walt Beach of Central Michigan had 542 rushing yards, 222 receiving yards, and 522 yards on kick returns, and scored 88 points.

Bill Larson led Western Illinois to a perfect 9–0 record, rushing for 890 yards and scoring 76 points.

Vince Tesone of Colorado Mines passed for 1,619 yards, rushed for 492 yards and seven touchdowns, and punted for an average of 42.2 yards.

Center Roger LeClerc made 50 percent of the tackles for Trinity (Connecticut), intercepted five passes (returning two for touchdowns), and also handled punting and place-kicking. He later played eight years in the NFL.

First team
 Back - Sam McCord (senior, 5'10", 180 pounds), East Texas
 Back - Walt Beach (senior, 6'0", 180 pounds), Central Michigan
 Back - Vince Tesone (senior, 5'11", 178 pounds), Colorado Mines
 Back - Bill Larson (5'11", 205 pounds), Western Illinois
 End - Hugh McInnis (senior, 6'3", 225 pounds), Mississippi Southern
 End - Tom Hackler (junior, 6'4", 195 pounds), Tennessee Tech
 Tackle - Walt Meineke (senior, 6'0", 215 pounds), Lehigh
 Tackle - Bob Zimpfer (senior, 6'4", 230 pounds), Bowling Green
 Guard - Gerald Lambert (senior, 5'10", 212 pounds), Texas A&I (NAIA national champion)
 Guard - Marvin Cisneros (junior, 5'11", 200 pounds), Willamette
 Center - Roger LeClerc (senior, 6'2", 235 pounds), Trinity (Connecticut)

Second team
 Back - Jim Sochor, San Francisco
 Back - Henry Hawk, Arkansas State
 Back - Bill Berrier, Juniata 
 Back - Jack Turner, Delaware
 End - John Simko, Augustana (South Dakota)
 End - Brady Luckett, Middle Tennessee
 Tackle - Bill Beck, Gustavus Adolphus
 Tackle - Jim Larkin, Hillsdale
 Guard - George Dempster, Hofstra
 Guard - Clarence Cheatham, Western Michigan
 Center - Curtis Miranda, Florida A&M

Third team
 Back - Lee Farmer, Lenoir Rhyne
 Back - Bill Shockley, West Chester
 Back - Dale Mills, Kirksville 
 Back - Brad Hustad, Luther 
 Back - George Phelps, Cornell (Iowa)
 End - Bill Wiljanen, Michigan Tech
 End - Al Badger, Southern Connecticut
 Tackle - Walt Stockslager, Butler 
 Tackle - Jim Pater, Coe
 Guard - Garvin Boggs, Chico State 
 Guard - Bill Ogden, Presbyterian
 Center - Rich Max, Cal Poly

See also
 1959 College Football All-America Team

References

Little All-America college football team
Little All-America college football team
Little All-America college football teams